The 2017 Clemson Tigers women's soccer team represents Clemson University during the 2017 NCAA Division I women's soccer season.  The Tigers are led by head coach Ed Radwanski, in his seventh season.  Home games are played at Riggs Field.

Roster

Updated September 5, 2017

Coaching staff

Source:

Preseason
The Tigers had one player, Sam Stabb, selected to the preseason All-ACC team.  The Tigers were ranked 6th in the pre-season ACC Coaches poll. The Tigers opened the season ranked 13th in the United Soccer Coaches' Poll and 21st in the Top Drawer Soccer Pre-Season poll.  These rankings come despite the fact Clemson lost 12 letter winners, and returns only three starters from the 2016 team that finished the regular season tied for first in the ACC and advanced to the Sweet 16 of the NCAA tournament.

Regular season
The Tigers started the regular season by recording two victories in the Hoosier Challenge Cup.  These two victories were enough to crown the Tigers champions of this opening season tournament.  Kimber Haley and Sam Stabb were named to the all tournament team. In the first game of the tournament, Mariana Speckmaier scored a hat trick, becoming the 15th player in Tigers history to score a hat trick, 8th Freshman to complete that feat and the second to score a hat trick in their debut.  The win over SIUE was also coach Eddie Radwanski's 200th career coaching win. The Tigers continued their winning ways beating Indiana 1–0 to become Hoosier Challenge Cup Champions. Upon returning home, Clemson won its first ranked match-up of the season against #20 Auburn on August 25. The Tigers continued by winning their next three games vs. UNC Greensboro, VCU, and Georgia.  From there the Tigers went on a 3-game losing streak.  At the start of this streak, the team reached a season high #4 ranking in the coaches poll, but dropped games to the #7 team, University of South Carolina, Notre Dame, and the #8 team North Carolina.  The Tigers then drew at Syracuse to end the skid. The Tigers only managed two goals in these four games after scoring 14 goals in their first 6 matches.  The Tigers finished a three-game road trip with a win in Miami.  Upon their return home, they lost to Louisville and beat Virginia Tech. The Tigers were back on the road and earned a draw at No. 14 Virginia.  In the final three games of the season, Clemson lost to North Carolina State, beat #15 Wake Forest, and drew with #23 Florida State.  This run saw them finish 9th in the conference, one spot out of making the 2017 ACC Women's Soccer Tournament.  The top 8 teams in the conference are invited to the tournament.

Postseason 
On November 6, the Tigers were selected to participate in the NCAA Tournament.  The Tigers were drawn to host Alabama on November 10 at Riggs Field.  The Tigers scored two late goals to advance past the Crimson Tide 2–1.  This win earned the Tigers a match with the #18 team in the country, Texas.  This match was to be played in Durham, North Carolina.  The Tigers again used a late goal to force overtime.  After two periods of scoreless overtime, the match when to penalty kicks.  However, Clemson came up short and lost the shootout 5–6.

Schedule

|-
!colspan=6 style=""| Exhibition

|-
!colspan=6 style=""| Non-Conference Regular season

|-
!colspan=6 style=""| Conference Regular season

|-
!colspan=6 style=""| NCAA Tournament

Goals Record

Disciplinary record

Awards and honors

Rankings

References

External links

Clemson
2017 in sports in South Carolina
Clemson
Clemson Tigers women's soccer seasons